The Biscubio is a river in the Umbria and Marche regions of Italy. Its source is in the province of Perugia near the border with the province of Pesaro e Urbino in the Appennino Umbro-Marchigiano mountains. The river flows northeast into Pesaro e Urbino south of Mercatello sul Metauro. It then flows east through the mountains near Apecchio and the exclave called Monte Ruperto belonging to Città di Castello until it joins the Candigliano near Piobbico.

References

Rivers of the Province of Perugia
Rivers of the Province of Pesaro and Urbino
Rivers of Italy